The Aura River (Finnish Aurajoki; Swedish Aura å) is a river in south-western Finland. Its sources are in Oripää, and it flows through Pöytyä, Aura and Lieto before discharging into the Archipelago Sea in the middle of the city of Turku. The waters of the Aura river are brown. The reserve tap water for Turku Region is drawn from the Aura, the city's secondary waterworks being situated by the Halinen rapids.

The word "Aura" appears to come from an archaic Swedish word for waterway (aathra, which is still current in the form ådra), but in Finnish it translates as "plough," a name the river lives up to. Situated in an agricultural zone, it is made turbid by surface runoff from nearby farms with eutrophication as the biggest threat. Its condition has been improving since the 1970s and the Aura river is now clean enough to support salmon.

The banks of the river have been inhabited for at least 6,000 years. The area is notable for the cultural heritage in Finland. The archdiocese of Finland has been situated near the river since the thirteenth century.

Gallery

See also
 Aura, Finland

References

Rivers of Finland
Turku
Aura, Finland
Drainage basins of the Baltic Sea
Landforms of Southwest Finland
Tourist attractions in Turku